, formerly , is a Japanese idol girl group from the musical collective Hello! Project, which originally consisted of four former Hello! Pro Egg (Hello! Project trainees) members that left Egg in 2010 and became full-time members of Hello! Project. In 2010, they won the Japan Record Award for Best New Artist. In 2011, five new girls were added to the group as part of the second generation, with two being former Egg members and three new girls. In 2014, three new members joined the group as third generation members.

Since the formation of Angerme, there have been ten generations and twelve departures. As of November 2021, the total number of members of the group stands at ten members.

History

Smileage era

2009: Formation
On April 4, Japanese music producer Tsunku announced on his blog that a new girl group consisting of Hello! Pro Egg members would be formed. The members would consist of Ayaka Wada, Yuuka Maeda, and Kanon Fukuda, all formerly of Shugo Chara Egg!, as well as fellow Egg Saki Ogawa. Ayaka was the designated group leader. A month later, on May 7, 2009, he revealed that the group would be called "Smileage". The name is a portmanteau of the English words "smile", "mileage", and "age", and together the name means "the age of smiles". In 2009 the group released three indie singles: "Ama no Jaku", "Asu wa Date na no ni, Ima Sugu Koe ga Kikitai" and "Suki-chan"

2010: Debut
After releasing three singles, Tsunku announced that the group would become a full-time group in the spring of 2010 and their debut was set for May 2010. A  was embarked upon to collect 10,000 smiles from people, where fans were asked to send in photographs of themselves smiling, compiled into a big mosaic. The group made their official event debut in Nagoya on March 19, with their fourth single "Otona ni Narutte Muzukashii!!!", released March 14, their first release on the Up-Front Works label. The result of the campaign was announced during the joint Smileage and Erina Mano concert on April 3. It was then announced that the group would be leaving from Hello! Pro Eggs.

Their first major single, "Yume Miru Fifteen", was released on May 26. Their debut album, Warugaki 1, was released on December 8, 2010. On December 30, Smileage received the Japan Record Award for Best New Artist.

2011–2014: The second generation
On May 29, 2011, Smileage revealed at their first-anniversary event that they would be holding auditions for new members to add to the four-member line-up and that some of the members would depart. The new members were announced on August 14. From Hello! Pro Egg, Akari Takeuchi and Rina Katsuta were added, and three other girls: Kana Nakanishi, Fuyuka Kosuga, and Meimi Tamura also joined.

On August 24, it was announced that Saki Ogawa would be leaving Smileage on August 27 and, subsequently, from Hello! Project. On September 9, one of Smileage's newest additions, Fuyuka Kosuga, was diagnosed with anaemia, after missing a concert due to illness. Due to her anaemia, she left the group and resumed her work as a Hello! Project Egg after her recovery.

Starting September 18, a second Smile Campaign was held by the new members to determine their place as official members in the group. On October 16, at Smileage's "Tachiagirl" event, producer Tsunku announced all four sub-members had become full members. On October 25, it was announced that Yuuka Maeda would leave Smileage and, subsequently, from Hello! Project on December 31.

On October 4, 2014, the group welcomed three new members: Mizuki Murota, Maho Aikawa and Rikako Sasaki. On December 17, 2014, it was announced that Smileage would change their name to Angerme, a name proposed by Kana Nakanishi which comes from a combination of the French words for angel (ange) and tear (larme).

Angerme Era

2015–2016: Re-brand and third, fourth, and fifth generation debut 
On May 20, 2015, Kanon Fukuda announced that she would be leaving Angerme and Hello! Project in the fall to continue with her university studies. On November 11, 2015, Angerme released their twentieth single, "Desugita Kui wa Utarenai / Dondengaeshi / Watashi." At the release event for this single, the winner of the 2015 Angerme Shin Member Audition and a sole fourth generation member was announced with Moe Kamikokuryo revealed as the new member. This was the first time a Hello! Project group other than Morning Musume welcomed a sole generation member. Kanon Fukuda officially left the group on November 29.

Less than a month after Fukuda's graduation, on December 20, 2015, during the Angerme Christmas Fanclub event, it was announced that Meimi Tamura would leave Angerme and Hello! Project in spring 2016. On May 30, 2016, Meimi Tamura graduated from Angerme. On July 16, 2016, a surprise announcement was made: Momona Kasahara, previously from Hello! Pro Kenshūsei, would join the group as the sole fifth generation member.

2017–2018: Sixth and seventh generation debut 
On January 11, 2017, Hello! Project announced the hiatus of Maho Aikawa until further notice, due to being diagnosed with panic disorder.

On June 26, Musubu Funaki, who transferred from Country Girls and Ayano Kawamura as a former Hello! Pro Kenshūsei, joined Angerme as new 6th generation members. Musubu continued her activities as a full member of Country girls until June 30, where she then became a full member of Angerme, and held a concurrent position in Country Girls. The sixth generation began activities in the group at the Hello! Project 2017 SUMMER concert tour on July 15.

On December 31, an announcement was posted to the Hello! Project website, stating that Maho Aikawa had decided to graduate from both Angerme and Hello! Project, after having been on hiatus from activities for the past twelve months. The graduation was effective immediately, making Aikawa the first of the third generation to graduate.

On April 5, 2018, Ayaka Wada made an announcement that she would graduate in one year, in spring 2019 at the end of a spring concert tour.

On November 3, seventh generation members Layla Ise and Haruka Ōta joined the group.

2019–present: Member graduations and new members
On June 18, Ayaka Wada graduated from Angerme and Hello! Project in the Hello Pro Premium Angerme Concert Tour 2019 Haru Final Wada Ayaka Sotsugyou Special Rinnetenshou ~Aru Toki Umareta Ai no Teishou~ at Nippon Budokan, becoming the longest-serving member and longest-serving leader of the group. With her graduation, there were no more first generation members in the group. Rina Katsuta graduated from Angerme and Hello! Project on September 25 at Hello! Project 2019 Summer in Pacifico Yokohama to pursue a career in fashion. One new member, Rin Hashisako from Hello! Pro Kenshuusei, joined the group as the eighth generation member. She is the 3rd solo generation to debut in the group, as well as the first to debut after all original 1st generation members have graduated. She was introduced on stage during the Hello! Project 2019 Summer concert tour from July 13. Rina Katsuta officially left the group on September 25. Kana Nakanishi graduated from both Angerme and Hello! Project on December 10, 2019, to study business administration and management. Musubu Funaki graduated from both Angerme and Hello! Project in March 2020. Kana Nakanishi left the group on December 10.

On January 22, 2020, it was announced that Mizuki Murota would graduate from both Angerme and Hello! Project in March 2020.

On February 28, it was announced that Haruka Ōta has been suspended from all activities for an indeterminate amount of time due to rule violations.

On March 22, Mizuki Murota officially left the group.

On April 21, it was announced that Musubu Funaki's graduation would be postponed indefinitely due to the COVID-19 pandemic.

On October 13, it was announced that Haruka Ōta had withdrawn from Angerme but would remain in Hello! Project.

Members

Current members
 Akari Takeuchi (–present; graduating Spring 2023)
 Rikako Sasaki (–present)
 Moe Kamikokuryo (–present)
 Ayano Kawamura (–present)
 Layla Ise (–present)
 Rin Hashisako (–present)
 Rin Kawana (–present)
 Shion Tamenaga (–present)
 Wakana Matsumoto (–present)
 Yuki Hirayama (–present)

Former members 
 Momona Kasahara (–2021)
 Musubu Funaki (2017–2020)
 Haruka Ōta (2018–2020)
 Mizuki Murota (2014–2020)
 Kana Nakanishi  (2011–2019)
 Rina Katsuta (2011–2019)
 Maho Aikawa (2014–2017)
 Meimi Tamura (2011–2016)
 Fuyuka Kosuga (2011)
 Ayaka Wada (2009–2019)
 Kanon Fukuda (2009–2015)
 Yuuka Maeda (2009–2011)
 Saki Ogawa (2009–2011)

Timeline

Discography

Studio albums

Singles

Movies 
  (2011)
 Kaidan Shin-mimi Bukuro Igyou(怪談新耳袋 異形,Tales of Terror from Tokyo and All Over Japan,Igyou)(2012)

Awards

Japan Record Awards

The Japan Record Awards is a major music awards show held annually in Japan by the Japan Composer's Association.

|-
|rowspan=2 align="center"| 2010
|rowspan=2| Smileage "Yume Miru 15"
| New Artist Award
| 
|-
| Best New Artist
|

References

External links 

 Angerme profile at Hello Project 
 smileageTV on USTREAM 
 Stickam JAPAN! official page 

 
Japanese pop music groups
Japanese dance music groups
Japanese electropop groups
Musical groups established in 2009
Japanese idol groups
Hello! Project groups
Pony Canyon artists
2009 establishments in Japan
Japanese girl groups
Child musical groups
Musical groups from Tokyo